The men's high jump at the 2018 IAAF World U20 Championships was held at Ratina Stadium on 12 and 14 July.

Records

Results

Qualification
The qualification round took place on 12 July, in two groups, both starting at 19:44. Athletes attaining a mark of at least 2.17 metres ( Q ) or at least the 12 best performers ( q ) qualified for the final.

Final
The final was held on 14 July at 10:40.

References

high jump
High jump at the World Athletics U20 Championships